Vetle Vislie (21 September 1858 – 7 February 1933) was a Norwegian educationalist and writer.

He was born in Skafså as a son of farmer Gjermund Vetleson Vislie (1825–1903) and Anne Larsdotter Mandt (1818–1904). He made his debut as a playwright in 1899, with Utan hovding, and wrote Fru Gerda in 1890. His novels include Heldøla (1895), Solvending (1897), Trollringar (1903), Malm (1906), Lukkespel (1911) and Det nye riket (1913). He was also the rector of the Teachers' Colleges in Kristiansand, from 1908, and Hamar, from 1914. He was a member of Hamar city council for the Temperance Party.

He was the father of lawyer Jon Vislie.

References

1858 births
1933 deaths
People from Tokke
Norwegian educators
Rectors of universities and colleges in Norway
Norwegian dramatists and playwrights
19th-century Norwegian novelists
20th-century Norwegian novelists
Norwegian non-fiction writers
Hedmark politicians
Norwegian temperance activists